The KrAZ-6322 is a Ukrainian off-road six-wheel drive truck intended for extreme conditions. It has been produced since 1994 and is manufactured at the KrAZ factory in Kremenchuk, Ukraine. It was first presented at the 1994 defence industry trade show in Kyiv.

Technical characteristics 
KrAZ-6322 specifications include:
Engine: YaMZ 238DE2 14.86 L 8 cyl turbodiesel, after 2014 Ford-Ecotorq 9.0l
Power: 330 PS (243 kW) at 2400 RPM
Torque:  at 1225 RPM
Top speed:

Variants 

 KrAZ-6322 "Soldier" (КрАЗ-6322 «Солдат») - cargo truck
 KrAZ-6322 AF1 (КрАЗ-6322 АФ1) - KUNG on KrAZ-6322 chassis
 KrAZ-6322RA (КрАЗ-6322РА) - BM-21 Grad on KrAZ-6322 chassis
 KrAZ-6322 "Raptor"
 KrAZ "Feona" - MRAP on KrAZ-6322 chassis
 KrAZ "Forpost" (КрАЗ "Форпост") - MRAP on KrAZ-6322 chassis
 KrAZ-63221 (КрАЗ-63221)
 RS-122 (დრს-122) - BM-21 Grad on KrAZ-63221 chassis
 ATs-12-63221 (АЦ-12-63221) - fuel tanker on KrAZ-63221 chassis
 ATsTV-10 (АЦТВ-10) — water tanker on KrAZ-63221 chassis
 АКТ-2/5 (63221) - fire truck on KrAZ-63221 chassis
 KrAZ-63221REB-01 «Sentry» (КрАЗ-6322РЭБ-01 «Часовой») - Kolchuga passive sensor on KrAZ-63221 chassis

Operators

 
  – ordered for Egyptian Armed Forces in 2012. Several hundred delivered to Egyptian Army.
  – 4 trucks with TMM-3M motorized bridges bought in 2015.
  – main transport and utility vehicle of the Defense Forces of Georgia
  – in 2008 15 sold to Indonesian National Police.
 
  – ordered for Iraq Armed Forces in June 2004. 2150 were delivered to Iraq until June 2007.
 
  – sold to Nigerian Armed Forces
  – 70 sold to Syrian Armed Forces
  – ordered for Royal Thai Armed Forces in April 2013. First ones delivered to Royal Thai Army in October 2013.
 
  – adopted as military truck for the Ukrainian Armed Forces in 2006. In February 2008 first 15 trucks were delivered to Ukrainian Army.

References

External links 
 Official page of civilian model KrAZ-6322
 Official page of military model KrAZ-6322 "Soldier"

KrAZ vehicles
Military trucks of Ukraine
Military vehicles introduced in the 1990s